Golden Earrings is a 1947 romantic spy film made by Paramount Pictures and starring Ray Milland and Marlene Dietrich. It was directed by Mitchell Leisen and produced by Harry Tugend from a screenplay by Frank Butler, Helen Deutsch and Abraham Polonsky, based on a novel by Jolán Földes. The music score was by Victor Young and the cinematography by Daniel L. Fapp.

The film's song, "Golden Earrings", with a tune by Victor Young and lyrics by Ray Evans and Jay Livingston, was sung in the movie by Murvyn Vye.  It was a hit recording in 1947-48 by Peggy Lee.

One film location was in the Metolius River area in July 1946 with approximately 30 extras from Bend, Oregon.

Plot
Starting in London, England in 1946 after World War II had been declared over, two items are delivered to a hotel: a small package for a retired British Major General Ralph Denistoun, and a telegram for an American named Quentin Reynolds.  The bellhop drops the telegram off to Quentin Reynolds first and he then takes the small package across the room to Ralph Denistoun.   When Ralph sees the box's point of origin, he opens the package revealing a pair of golden earrings, holding one up to his pierced ear while looking at his reflection in a window. Denistoun later boards a plane from London to Paris, finding himself seated next to Reynolds, who asks Denistoun why has he kept the reason for his pierced ears a secret for so long.  Denistoun then tells him the story.

Before the war had officially broken out, he and another man named Richard Byrd were already in Germany, being held captive by a man named Hoff.  They plotted to escape, planning to meet at the home of a friend of Byrd's father, Professor Otto Krosigk, who had developed a special poison gas formula.  Splitting up with Byrd after their escape, Denistoun came across a gypsy lady named Lydia who helped him get across country with her horse and wagon by dressing him up as a gypsy to disguise him from the Nazis.  Reaching the city where Denistoun was to regroup with Byrd, they find that Byrd has been captured by the Germans while trying to reach Professor Krosigk on his own.

As Hoff and two of his men tried using a flame to make Byrd talk, Denistoun revealed himself and shot all three of the Nazis.  Byrd, already near death, died.  Lydia and another gypsy named Zoltan helped him get rid of the bodies and get to Professor Krosigk's home.  The professor did not believe Denistoun initially, but a visit from some German soldiers convinced him of Denistoun's authenticity.  He then gave Denistoun the gas formula, written on a bill of German cash.  Denistoun was then able to leave without the Germans discovering his identity.

Lydia then led him to a point on the High Rhine where he could swim across to Switzerland with the formula in a special container.  Ralph had removed his earrings and coat, giving them back to Lydia before plunging into the river.

Once Denistoun reaches Paris, he visits the very place where he remembered leaving Lydia several years ago, spotting her horse, Apple, and her wagon across the river.  Putting the earrings back on, Denistoun spits three times in the river, per gypsy tradition, before crossing the river.  One the other side, he calls out to Lydia, who is excited to see him.  The two then get into the wagon, Lydia puts the coat back on him and the two ride off.

Cast

 Ray Milland as Ralph Denistoun
 Marlene Dietrich as Lydia
 Murvyn Vye as Zoltan
 Bruce Lester as Richard Byrd
 Dennis Hoey as Hoff
 Quentin Reynolds as himself
 Reinhold Schünzel as Prof. Otto Krosigk
 Ivan Triesault as Maj. Reimann
 Hermine Sterler as Greta Krosigk

References

External links
Several scenes were filmed on the Oregon side of the Columbia River Gorge. At 39:30 they cross a bridge located at Eagle Creek on Old US Highway 30, two miles east of Bonneville Dam. Around the 120min mark they are in the area of Horsetail Falls, the falls is shown in the background.

 

1947 films
Paramount Pictures films
Films scored by Victor Young
Films based on Hungarian novels
Films directed by Mitchell Leisen
Films shot in Oregon
American black-and-white films
American spy films
1947 romantic drama films
American romantic drama films
Films about Romani people
Films set in 1946
1940s spy films
1940s English-language films
1940s American films